Greenlawn may refer to:

 Greenlawn, Missouri
 Greenlawn, New York
 Greenlawn (Middletown, Delaware), a historic house
 Greenlawn (Amite City, Louisiana), a historic mansion
 Greenlawn Ltd., a Canadian lawn services company that does business as TruGreen

See also
 Greenlawn Cemetery (disambiguation)
 Trinity School at Greenlawn, South Bend, Indiana